Commonwealth & Comparative Politics is a quarterly peer-reviewed academic journal of political science covering comparative politics, with an emphasis on the Commonwealth of Nations. It was established in 1961 as the Journal of Commonwealth Political Studies and renamed The Journal of Commonwealth & Comparative Politics in 1974, before obtaining its current title in 1998. The editors-in-chief are Andrew Wyatt (University of Bristol) and Nicola de Jager (Stellenbosch University). Past editors include Vicky Randall, Colin Leys, and Kenneth Robinson (historian). The journal is published by Taylor & Francis.

Abstracting and indexing
The journal is abstracted and indexed in:
EBSCO databases
Emerging Sources Citation Index
Scopus

References

External links

Political science journals
Publications established in 1961
Quarterly journals
English-language journals
Taylor & Francis academic journals
Commonwealth of Nations